The Rangers Step In is a 1937 American Western film directed by Spencer Gordon Bennet and written by Nate Gatzert. The film stars Robert Allen, Eleanor Stewart, John Merton, Wally Wales, Jack Ingram and Jack Rockwell. The film was released on August 8, 1937, by Columbia Pictures.

Plot

Cast          
Robert Allen as Bob Allen 
Eleanor Stewart as Terry Warren
John Merton as Martin
Wally Wales as Breck Warren
Jack Ingram as Fred
Jack Rockwell as Marshal
Jay Wilsey as Ranger Capt. Thomas
Lafe McKee as Jed Warren

References

External links
 

1937 films
1930s English-language films
American Western (genre) films
1937 Western (genre) films
Columbia Pictures films
Films directed by Spencer Gordon Bennet
American black-and-white films
1930s American films